Fish Market is a mid 16th century painting by Dutch artist Joachim Beuckelaer. Done in oil on wood (Baltic oak), the work depicts a bustling fish market. Painting during the waning years of the Beeldenstorm, the painting reflects the changing subject of Dutch art from religious to secular themes. The work is currently in the collection of the Metropolitan Museum of Art.

References 

1568 paintings
Dutch paintings
Paintings in the collection of the Metropolitan Museum of Art
Fish in art